Sukrutai Tommaoros (born 5 February 1982) is a Thai diver. She competed in the women's 10 metre platform event at the 1996 Summer Olympics.

References

1982 births
Living people
Sukrutai Tommaoros
Sukrutai Tommaoros
Divers at the 1996 Summer Olympics
Place of birth missing (living people)
Divers at the 1998 Asian Games
Divers at the 2006 Asian Games
Sukrutai Tommaoros